The kāmao or large Kauai thrush (Myadestes myadestinus) was a small, dark solitaire endemic to Kauai in the Hawaiian Islands.

Characteristics
 
The male and female of the species looked similar. It was dark brown above and gray below, with black legs. It was closely related to the other species of Hawaiian thrushes, the Puaiohi (M. palmeri), the Ōmao (M. obscurus) and the likely-extinct olomao (M. lanaiensis).

Its song was a complex melody composed of flute-like notes, liquid warbles, buzzy trills, and gurgling whistles.  The call was a raspy "braak," with an alternate high pitched note similar to a police whistle.  The bird occurred in the understory of densely vegetated gulches, where it often perched motionlessly in a hunched posture. Like other native Hawaiian thrushes, it often quivered its wings and fed primarily on fruit and insects. 

There was no segregation on the thrushes that existed either on Molokai or Lanai, which were given the name Olomao.  In addition, there was no confirmation of any thrush sighting on Maui. On Kauai, there were more than one thrush species that were documented and accounted for. With a fighter-jet-like flying maneuver, the thrush used to fly vertically while singing melodies and then flying down into the lower lush canopy.    

While not confirmed, but it was never seen flying below 3,500 feet in Kauai. Even though the bird was a frequent resident, the last documented sighting was in 1989, but it was not documented in a 2000 bird survey.

Extinction

In the late 1800s, it was considered the most common bird on Kauai, occurring throughout all areas of the island, but land clearing and avian malaria brought on by introduced mosquitoes decimated the birds.  Shortly after its discovery in 1826, the bird became extinct and no specimens of it was known. Introduced animals such as feral pigs (which create pools for their wallows, in which mosquitoes can breed) and rats (which feed on eggs and unfledged birds) also contributed to the bird's demise.  Competition from introduced bird species may also have led to further declines.

The kāmao is classified as extinct.  The last probable sighting occurred in 1989 in the Alakai Wilderness Preserve, its last stronghold. On September 29, 2021, the U.S. Fish and Wildlife Service declared the large Kauai thrush extinct.

References

External links
BirdLife Species Factsheet
3D view of specimens RMNH 110.024 and RMNH 110.025 at Naturalis, Leiden (requires QuickTime browser plugin).

http://www.hdouglaspratt.com/journal_articles/1982_pratt_myadestes.pdf
https://dlnr.hawaii.gov/wildlife/files/2019/03/SWAP-2015-Kamao-Final.pdf

Myadestes
Endemic birds of Hawaii
Extinct birds of Hawaii
Bird extinctions since 1500
Biota of Kauai
Birds described in 1887
Taxonomy articles created by Polbot
ESA endangered species